Bruce Clark (born 13 November 1958 in Canterbury, New South Wales, Australia) is an Australian former professional rugby league footballer who played first-grade for the Western Suburbs Magpies.

References

Living people
1958 births
Western Suburbs Magpies players
Australian rugby league players
Rugby league props
Rugby league players from Sydney